The Baptist Convention of Mozambique is a Baptist Christian denomination in Mozambique. It is affiliated with the Baptist World Alliance. The headquarters is in Maputo.

History
The Baptist Convention of Mozambique has its origins in a mission of the National Baptist Convention, USA, Inc. in 1925.  It is officially founded in 1957.  According to a denomination census released in 2020, it claimed 726 churches and 108,900 members.

See also 
 Bible
 Born again
 Worship service (evangelicalism)
 Jesus Christ
 Believers' Church

References

External links
 Official Website

Baptist denominations in Africa
Evangelicalism in Mozambique